The 1966 Bowling Green Falcons football team was an American football team that represented Bowling Green State University in the Mid-American Conference (MAC) during the 1966 NCAA University Division football season. In their second season under head coach Bob Gibson, the Falcons compiled a 6–3 record (4–2 against MAC opponents), finished in third place in the MAC, and outscored opponents by a combined total of 187 to 124.

The team's statistical leaders included P.J. Nyitray with 431 passing yards, Dave Cranmer with 374 rushing yards, and Eddie Jones with 525 receiving yards.

Schedule

References

Bowling Green
Bowling Green Falcons football seasons
Bowling Green Falcons football